Oleshky Raion was one of the 18 administrative raions (a district) of Kherson Oblast in southern Ukraine. Its administrative center was located in the city of Oleshky. The raion was abolished on 18 July 2020 as part of the administrative reform of Ukraine, which reduced the number of raions of Kherson Oblast to five. The area of Oleshky Raion was merged into Kherson Raion. The last estimate of the raion population was 

In May 2016, the Verkhovna Rada renamed Tsiurupynsk Raion to Oleshky Raion conform with the law prohibiting names of the communist origin.

At the time of disestablishment, the raion consisted of four hromadas:
 Oleshky urban hromada with the administration in Oleshky;
 Velyki Kopani rural hromada with the administration in the selo of Velyki Kopani;
 Vynohradove rural hromada with the administration in the selo of Vynohradove;
 Yuvileine rural hromada with the administration in the settlement of Yuvileine.

References

Former raions of Kherson Oblast
1923 establishments in Ukraine
Ukrainian raions abolished during the 2020 administrative reform